Pitcairnia pseudoundulata is a plant species in the genus Pitcairnia.

Cultivars
 Pitcairnia 'Flaming Arrow'

References
BSI Cultivar Registry Retrieved 11 October 2009

pseudoundulata